Eric Francis Spina is an American engineer and academic administrator who has served as president of the University of Dayton since July 1, 2016.

Early life and education 
Spina was born and raised in the University Heights district of Buffalo, New York, where he attended Canisius High School. Spina earned his bachelor's degree in mechanical engineering from Carnegie Mellon University, followed by a master's degree and PhD in aerospace engineering from Princeton University.

Career 
Spina began his career at Syracuse University, where he was a faculty member in the College of Engineering & Computer Science. He became dean of the department in 2003, and later served as vice chancellor and provost of the university from July 2006. In 2013, Spina served as the interim chancellor and president before Kent Syverud assumed the office. He served as the Trustee Professor prior to the presidency at Dayton.

Spina was selected as the University of Dayton's 19th president in the summer of 2015. He officially took office in July 2016. In 2018, Spina's contract was extended through 2024.

Personal life
Spina lives in Dayton with his wife, Karen, their two children, and two dogs.

References 

Year of birth missing (living people)
Living people
University of Dayton people
Heads of universities and colleges in the United States
Carnegie Mellon University alumni
Princeton University alumni

People from Buffalo, New York
Engineers from New York (state)